Liquid is a phase of matter.

Liquid or liquidity may also refer to:

Business
 Accounting liquidity, the ability of a debtor to pay their debts as and when they fall due
 Liquid capital, the amount of money that a firm holds
 Market liquidity, the ability to buy or sell a particular commodity quickly without causing a significant price fluctuation

Music and dance
 Liquid funk, a subgenre of drum and bass
 Liquid dancing, a form of dance in which a dancer's gesticulations flow fluidly
 Liquid (musician), a British dance act
 Liquid (EP), an EP by Le1f & Boody
 Liquid (Recoil album), a 2000 music album by Recoil
 Liquid, a 2009 music album by Urlaub in Polen
 "Liquid", a song by Jars of Clay from Jars of Clay (album)
 "Liquid" (The Rasmus song), a 1998 song by The Rasmus
 "Liquid", a song by Brockhampton from Saturation III

Science and technology
 Liquid, a template engine from the e-commerce system Shopify
 Liquid crystal, substances that exhibit a phase of matter that has properties between those of a conventional liquid and those of a solid crystal
 Liquid layout, a web design that does not rely upon fixed widths
 Liquid nitrogen vehicle, a vehicle powered by liquid nitrogen, which is stored in a tank
 Liquidambar, or liquid amber, a genus of four species of flowering plants in the family Altingiaceae

Other uses
 Liquid consonant, an approximate consonant (like /l/, /r/) that does not correspond phonetically to a specific vowel
 Liquid Snake, a character in the Metal Gear video game franchise
 Liquid Entertainment, a computer game development company
 Team Liquid, an electronic sports team and community website

See also
 Drink